Mount Rubin de la Borbolla is an ice-covered mountain (1,090 m) in the southeast extremity of McDonald Heights, overlooking Johnson Glacier from the west in Marie Byrd Land. Mapped by United States Geological Survey (USGS) from surveys and U.S. Navy air photos, 1959–65. Named by Advisory Committee on Antarctic Names (US-ACAN) for George S. Rubin de la Borbolla, meteorologist at Plateau Station, 1968.

References

 

Mountains of Marie Byrd Land